Lada Stanislavivna Nesterenko (born August 3, 1976) is a Ukrainian cross-country skier who competed between 1995 and 2017. At the 2010 Winter Olympics, she finished 44th in the 30 km and 57th in the 10 km events.

Nesterenko's best finish at the FIS Nordic World Ski Championships was seventh in the 30 km event at Sapporo in 2007.

Her best World Cup finish was 11th in the 4 × 5 km relay event at France in 2008 while his best individual finish was 25th in the 10 km event at Estonia in 2009.

Cross-country skiing results
All results are sourced from the International Ski Federation (FIS).

Olympic Games

World Championships

a.  Cancelled due to extremely cold weather.

World Cup

Season standings

References

External links

1976 births
Cross-country skiers at the 2010 Winter Olympics
Living people
Olympic cross-country skiers of Ukraine
Ukrainian female cross-country skiers
Medalists at the 2014 Winter Paralympics
Paralympic bronze medalists for Ukraine
Paralympic sighted guides
Biathletes at the 2014 Winter Paralympics
Ukrainian female biathletes
Paralympic medalists in cross-country skiing
Paralympic medalists in biathlon
Paralympic cross-country skiers of Ukraine
Paralympic biathletes of Ukraine